Levomoprolol is a beta adrenergic antagonist.  It is the (S)-enantiomer of moprolol.

References

Beta blockers
N-isopropyl-phenoxypropanolamines
Catechol ethers